The Labuan Museum is a museum located along Jalan Dewan in central Labuan, Malaysia.

History
The museum building was originally constructed in the 1950s. It was once the administration office of the British North Borneo government. After the formation of Malaysia in 1963, the building was once used as the Labuan district office and Labuan Municipal Council office building. In 1997, restoration works were done to the building followed by interior design works in 2002. The museum was officially opened on 8 October 2004 as the third museum opened in Labuan by Culture, Arts and Heritage Minister Rais Yatim.

Architecture
The museum building is a colonial era building which consists of 2 floors.

Exhibitions
The museum showcases the history and culture of Labuan. On the lower floor, it displays the history of Labuan since its prehistory until the birth of Labuan as a federal territory of Malaysia and the establishment of Labuan as the international offshore financial centre. On the upper floor, it displays the culture and economy of the Labuan people through six sections through various artifacts, such as musical instrument, weapons, clothes etc.

See also
 List of museums in Malaysia

References

2004 establishments in Malaysia
Museums established in 2004
Museums in Labuan